Technical and Madrasah Education Division is a Bangladesh government division under the Ministry of Education responsible for Technical and Madrasah education in Bangladesh. It is responsible for 113 public technical education institutes and 03 public madrassas and 4727 private technical education institutes and 7620 private madrassas.

History
The Government of Bangladesh split the Education Ministry into two divisions, Technical and Madrasah Education Division and Secondary and Higher Education Division, on 30 November 2016. It received 7,453 crore taka budget in 2019 which was a slight increase over the last year.

References

2016 establishments in Bangladesh
Organisations based in Dhaka
Government departments of Bangladesh